The astronomer Edward Emerson Barnard compiled a list of dark nebulae known as the Barnard Catalogue of Dark Markings in the Sky, or the Barnard Catalogue for short. The nebulae listed by Barnard have become known as Barnard objects. A 1919 version of the catalogue listed 182 nebulae; by the time of the posthumously published 1927 version, it listed 369.

See also
 List of dark nebulae

References 

barnard
Astronomical catalogues of nebulae

External links 
 Barnard's Catalogue of 349 Dark Objects in the Sky, VizieR listing at CDS